Oliver O. Mbamara is a Nigerian filmmaker, actor, writer, lawyer, and publisher.

Career
After graduating in Law from the University of Lagos and Nigerian Law School, he practiced law in Nigeria while simultaneously engaging in writing scripts and poetic pieces in which he also performed and while touring around Nigeria with a theater troupe called Prime Circle. He later moved to the United States where he passed the New York bar examination and was subsequently admitted to practice as an attorney. He is currently an administrative law judge with the State of New York.

Aside from his professional training as a lawyer, Mbamara is a published writer, poet, publisher, editor, actor, filmmaker, director, and more. He continues to simultaneously make an impact in these varied fields. Mbamara is an international freelance writer as well as a columnist with several national, international and regional news magazines news journals, newspapers, and online magazines. His audience is spread around the world and cuts across tribes, races, gender, and profession. Mbamara's articles, poems, and editorials are regularly featured in newspapers, magazines, and websites around the world. He has at least six books to his credit: Why Are We Here? 2004, Flame of Love, The Unrestricted, 2004, Flame of Love, The Spark of God, 2002, Love Poems and Quotes, 2003, Poems of Life, 2nd Edition, 2002, and Poems of Life, 2001.

In 2001, a few years after arriving in the United States, Mbamara launched his first book Poems of Life and played the lead-actor role in an off-Broadway dance drama, Prof. Chudis' Prisoner of the Kalakiri. In 2003, Mbamara directed and played the lead in the stage recreation of Zulu Sofola's Wedlock of the Gods, in New York. Mbamara stars in two feature films: This America and Slave Warrior. He is the writer of This America, in which he also served as Assistant Director and Co-Producer. He is also the writer and director of the feature film Slave Warrior, an African historical action thriller. He is currently working on releasing a book version of the story as a novel or historical literature piece.

Television production
Mbamara has also delved into television production and created, wrote, and directed Cultures. Cultures aims at tolerance amongst differing cultures using humor. In it, an African chief sent from Africa by his kinsmen to bring a wife to their son Ozobio who has stayed too long in America without returning home, arrives America to find out that Ozobio is engaged to an American woman. The chief's persistence leads to a conflict of cultures with the American woman and ultimately to Ozobio's dilemma.

Filmography
Slave Warrior
This America
The Return of the Spade
Spade: The Last Assignment (2008)
On the Run Again (2010 sequel to This America)

See also
 List of Nigerian film producers

References

External links

20th-century Nigerian lawyers
University of Lagos alumni
Living people
Nigerian emigrants to the United States
Year of birth missing (living people)
Nigerian film actors
Nigerian writers
Nigerian publishers (people)
Nigerian film directors
American lawyers
Nigerian poets
Nigerian editors
Nigerian television producers